Stomatorhinus is a genus of small elephantfish in the family Mormyridae.

Species 
There are currently 13 recognized species in this genus:

 Stomatorhinus ater Pellegrin 1924 (Kidada mormyrid)
 Stomatorhinus corneti Boulenger 1899 (Stanley Pool mormyrid)
 Stomatorhinus fuliginosus Poll 1941 (Mosongolia mormyrid)
 Stomatorhinus humilior Boulenger 1899 (Ibali mormyrid)
 Stomatorhinus ivindoensis Sullivan & Hopkins 2005 (Biale Creek mormyrid)
 Stomatorhinus kununguensis Poll 1945 (Kunungu mormyrid)
 Stomatorhinus microps Boulenger 1898 (Boma mormyrid)
 Stomatorhinus patrizii Vinciguerra 1928 (Buta mormyrid)
 Stomatorhinus polli Matthes 1964 (Ikela mormyrid)
 Stomatorhinus polylepis Boulenger 1899 (Isangila mormyrid)
 Stomatorhinus puncticulatus Boulenger 1899 (Chiloango mormyrid)
 Stomatorhinus schoutedeni Poll 1945 (Schouteden's mormyrid)
 Stomatorhinus walkeri (Günther 1867) (Walker mormyrid)

References 

Weakly electric fish
Mormyridae
Ray-finned fish genera